The episodes of the Reborn! anime series, also known as Katekyō Hitman Reborn!, is a Japanese television series directed by Kenichi Imaizumi and produced and animated by Artland. It first began airing in Japan on the television network TV Tokyo on October 7, 2006, and has since broadcast over 200 episodes, which are each referred to as a "Target". The anime is an adaptation of Akira Amano's manga series of the same name, which was first serialized in Japan's Weekly Shōnen Jump in 2004. The series centers around the life of Tsunayoshi "Tsuna" Sawada, a timid boy who learns he is the great-great-great grandson of the founder of the Italian Vongola Mafia family. Tsuna, who is the only living heir, must learn to become a proper Mafia boss and is required to undergo training from the Vongola's number one hitman, an infant named Reborn.

As of June 26, 2009, a total of twenty-eight DVD volumes have been released in Japan by Marvelous Entertainment, with another four scheduled to have consecutive monthly releases. The DVDs have secondary volume titles: the first eight volumes are "Bullets" which contains the first thirty-three episodes; the next eight are "Battles", and contains episodes 34 to 65; volumes seventeen and eighteen are "Daily Chapters", containing episodes 66 to 73; volumes nineteen to twenty-five are "Burn" volumes, and contains episodes 75 to 101; and twenty-sixth onwards are referred to as "X.Burn" volumes.

In 2008, Funimation, on behalf of Japan's d-rights production company, exercised a power of attorney to remove fansubbed episodes of the Reborn! anime from the internet. Thus, to prevent copyright infringement, cease and desist notices were sent to fansub groups who were subtitling the series. On March 21, 2009, d-rights collaborated with the anime-streaming website Crunchyroll in order to begin streaming subbed episodes of the Japanese-dubbed series in North America. New episodes were available within an hour after the airing in Japan.

On April 19, 2017, the first Blu-ray box set released with episodes 1 to 73 including 2 CDs. The second box set includes episodes 74 to 141 along with 1 CD, and the third box set includes episodes 142 to 203 and 2 CDs. The Blu-ray box sets were released celebrating the series' 10th anniversary.

Episode list

Season 1 (2006–07)

Season 2 (2007–08)

Season 3 (2008)

Season 4 (2008)

Season 5 (2008–09)

Season 6 (2009)

Season 7 (2009–10)

Season 8 (2010)

Season 9 (2010)

Original video animations (OVA)

DVD releases
Marvelous Entertainment, the Japanese company that handles the DVD distribution of the series, released the first volume on January 26, 2007. Each disc contains special features. A total of twenty-four volumes have been released in Japan as of February 27, 2009. Volumes twenty-five to twenty-eight are scheduled to have consecutive monthly releases this year. So far, only Region 2 coded DVDs have been released in Japan.

Each volume has so far contained only one disc, with each containing four episodes, save the eighth volume ("Bullet 8"), which contains five episodes. Besides the secondary volume titles - Bullet, Battle, Daily Chapter, Burn, X.Burn and Choice - there are also subtitles below the Reborn! title in the Battle and Burn volumes. The Battle volumes are subtitled "vs Varia", while the Burn volumes are subtitled "The Future".

On April 19, 2017, the first Blu-ray box was released, including episodes 1-73 and two bonus drama CDs. The second box includes episodes 74-141 and one bonus drama CD. Lastly the third box includes episodes 142-203 and also one bonus drama CD and a bonus disc.

Season 1: Bullet

Season 2: Battle

Season 3: Daily Chapter

Season 4: The Future

Season 5: The Future X

Season 6: Arcobaleno

Season 7: The Choice Battle

Season 8: The Original Family Of "Vongola"

Season 9: The Final Battle

Compilations

 Note: There are no box sets for Season 6 (Ep. 142 - 153) & Season 8 (Ep. 178 - 189).

Blu-ray Box Sets
 Note: All Blu-ray discs are not restricted by DVD region code.

Discotek Media SD on BD Sets

See also

List of Reborn! chapters
List of Reborn! characters

References
General
  - Official anime episode list.
 
 
 
 
 
 
 
 
Specific

External links
 Official Reborn! website
 Official anime website 
 TV Tokyo's official anime website